The 1933 Washington and Lee Generals football team was an American football team that represented Washington and Lee University during the 1933 college football season as a member of the Southern Conference. In their first year under head coach Warren E. Tilson, the team compiled an overall record of 4–4–2, with a mark of 1–1–1 in conference play.

Schedule

References

Washington and Lee
Washington and Lee Generals football seasons
Washington and Lee Generals football